Frank Card Bourne (17 July 1914 - 1983) was an American classicist.

Life 
He was born on 17 July 1914. His parents were Moses Avander and Grace Winchester.

He died in 1983.

Career 
He graduated from Princeton University with his bachelor's degree in 1936 and a PhD in 1941.  He was the Kennedy Foundation Professor of Latin Language and Literature there from 1946 to 1976.

Bibliography 
Some of his books are:

 A history of the Romans
 The public works of the Julio-Claudians and Flavians
 The Roman alimentary program and Italian agriculture 
 The Corpus of roman law, Ancient roman statutes

References

External links
 

1914 births
1983 deaths
Princeton University alumni
Princeton University faculty
American classical scholars